Garra bibarbatus is a species of ray-finned fish in the genus Garra from Vietnam.

References

Garra
Fish described in 2001
Fish of Vietnam
Cyprinid fish of Asia